Natalie Amrossi, also professionally recognized by her Instagram handle MISSHATTAN, is a former financial services broker at JP Morgan who left her job to become an aerial photographer. She has expanded her focus into fine-art photography and digital art.

She was born in Queens, NY and graduated from Stony Brook University. She regularly has appeared in lists of the best photographers to follow and has appeared in media such as NY Post, Today, Forbes, Entrepreneur and several others. 

Natalie is currently serving as a creative ambassador for Canon. She has previously served as creative ambassador for Cadillac and Heineken. Her clients have included Jaguar, AT&T, Nike, Adidas, Apple, Amex, Cadillac, Canon, Heineken, Budweiser, Verizon, Hewlett-Packard and Beats by Dre. She is one of three artists chosen to be part of the Yves Saint Laurent NFT collection called YSK Beauty Night Masters. 

She is currently engaged to talk show and professional wrestling host, Peter Rosenberg.

Links 
Instagram

References

Living people
People from Queens, New York
Year of birth missing (living people)
21st-century American women photographers
21st-century American photographers
Stony Brook University alumni
Aerial photographers